Lanchang is a small town in Temerloh District, Pahang, Malaysia. It is accessible via the East Coast Expressway's Lanchang Interchange.

The Kuala Gandah Elephant Conservation Centre is situated in Lanchang. This is the main attraction of this small town apart from agriculture and the many Felda projects of both rubber and palm oil plantations. Other agriculture activities are thriving well today, because it has a low population density, yet still has much land available for agriculture.

Kuala Gandah Elephant Conservation Centre
The Asian Elephant, Elephus maximus ongkili is listed as an endangered species. According to the UNEP there are only about 1,000 wild Asian elephants left on the Malay peninsula. The rapid development phase in Malaysia has effects on the elephants. Unused land and forest became a much sought after commodity. As agricultural development rapidly encroached into these areas, the elephants' natural and ancestral foraging ground shrunk smaller and smaller. Consequently, some of these elephants began to forage in new farm areas and plantations.

An effort by the Department of Wildlife and National Parks was the setting up of an elephant translocation unit in 1974 to track down, capture and then release these elephants into larger and safer forest reserves throughout the Peninsula.

References

Towns in Pahang
Populated places in Pahang